Epukiro is a cluster of small settlements in the remote eastern part of the Omaheke Region of Namibia, situated about  northeast of the regional capital Gobabis. The centre of the populated area is the Catholic mission station. Epukiro had about 3,200 inhabitants in 1997, predominantly ethnic Tswana.

Epukiro was since Namibian independence part of Otjinene Constituency. This constituency was split in 2004 and the new Epukiro Constituency was created.

History
The settlement was formed in 1902 when Roman Catholic Church bought the 30,000 ha farm Epukiro. Namesake of the farm and the settlement is the Epukiro River, an ephemeral river which cuts the farm from west to east. 

A mission station was founded in 1904 by the Missionary Oblates of Mary Immaculate, a Catholic congregation. It was destroyed one year later during the Herero and Namaqua War. The German colonial administration opened a post office in 1905.

The Herero and Namaqua War of 1904–1907 saw tens of thousands of Ovaherero killed, almost its entire population. Survivors had lost their land and cattle, and the land originally in the hands of the Herero was now farmland in the possession of white settlers. When after World War I Germany lost all its colonies and South-West Africa became mandate territory of South Africa, the new administration was unable, perhaps unwilling, to undo the land transfer.
A South African administrator writes:
"Seeing that the whole Hereroland was confiscated by the Germans and cut up into farms and is now settled by Europeans it would be an impossible project ... to place them back on their tribal lands."
To accommodate the Ovaherero, the South African administration created eight "native reserves" for them of which the Epukiro Reserve was one. The Epukiro Reserve as administrative structure existed until the 1970s.

People
Epukiro is inhabited by Tswana, Ovambanderu, and San people. Ovambanderu and Herero people share the same ancestry. Herero see the Mbanderu as one of their clans while Mbanderu regard themselves as a distinct group. This difference is the cause of a decades–old rift between the two, with one faction, the Ovambanderu Council of Epukiro and Aminuis seeking recognition of the Mbanderu as a distinct tribe. The other faction aims for a strong and united Herero people under the Tjamuaha-Maharero Royal House and accuses the Mbanderu of artificial division.

Today the Ovambanderu Traditional Authority is the heir of the Ovambanderu Council. The royal homestead is located at Ezorongondo.

After the death of Mbanderu paramount chief Munjuku Nguvauva II in 2008 the rift in the Ovambanderu community deepened. One faction calling themselves the "Concerned Group" supported Keharanjo Nguvauva as successor to the throne. They crowned him in 2008 because he was born in wedlock of Munjuku and his wife Aletta. The other faction of the  Ovambanderu Traditional Authority favoured his older half-brother, Deputy Minister of Fisheries Kilus Nguvauva. A government enquiry commission confirmed Keharanjo as chief in 2009. After the death of Keharanjo, Aletta was elected as the paramount chief to succeed her son Keharanjo.

Economy and Infrastructure
The village is underdeveloped with regards to access to safe water and sanitation, and medical care. There is a government clinic at Epukiro but no ambulance and no mortuary. The main economic activity is farming with cattle and goats. While the Mbanderu are reasonably well-off, the San live in abject poverty.

Epukiro is situated on the national road C22 halfway between Okakarara and Gobabis. It is further connected by road to Gam, Okatumba and Eiseb, and to Otjombinde. These roads are not tarred and in generally bad shape.

Education
There are four schools in the Epukiro area, among them:
 Epukiro Post 3 Junior Secondary School
 Epukiro Roman Catholic Primary School for 300 children

References

Populated places in the Omaheke Region
1902 establishments in German South West Africa
Populated places established in 1902